Adel Al-Saraawi is a former member of the Kuwaiti National Assembly, representing the third district. Born in 1962, Al-Saraawi studied accounting before being elected to the National Assembly in 2003.  He is considered an Independent deputy, but affiliates with the Islamist members.

Defended Education Minister Nouria al-Subeih
On January 22, 2008, the parliament voted 27-19, with two abstentions, against the impeachment of Education Minister Nouria al-Subeih.

In the lead-up to the vote, Saleh Ashour, Ali Al-Daqbaashi, Musallam Al-Barrak and Hussein Muzyed spoke against the minister while Al-Saraawi, Khalaf Al-Enezi, Ali Al-Rashid, and Mohammed Al-Sager spoke in her defense.

Subeih had to defend herself against allegations that she had attempted to deceive the nation when she denied a press report that three male students had been sexually assaulted by an Asian worker at a state school. She explained she had been misinformed and issued an apology.

Islamist lawmaker Saad al-Shreih also accused Subeih of not showing enough respect for Islam when she did not punish a 14-year-old girl who had allegedly drawn a cross on her religion textbook and scribbled notes on it that she hated Islam. The minister told the house there was no evidence the girl had actually done that and so she was just referred to counseling. Shreih, however, still managed to gather the requisite signatures of ten lawmakers to force the no-confidence vote.

Resignation of Oil Minister
On June 25, 2007, Al-Saraawi, Abdullah Al-Roumi, Musallam Al-Barrak accused Oil Minister Sheik Ali Al Jarrah Al-Sabah of using his influence when he was chief executive officer of Kuwait's Burgan Bank to open accounts at the request of his cousin, in the names of paper companies so that they could be used for siphoning the stolen money.  Minister Al-Sabah, who is a member of the royal family, resigned before a vote of no-confidence could be held against him.  Transportation Minister Sharedah al-Mawashergi resigned in solidarity with the Oil Minister.

Supported government funds for college tuition
On September 28, 2008, Al-Saraawi, along with MPs Abdullah Al-Roumi, Ali Al-Rashid and Marzouq Al-Ghanem proposed a draft law which suggested that the government fund Kuwaiti students' higher education at private colleges. According to the bill, the government would bear half of the expenses for students enrolled in private universities in Kuwait, excluding Kuwait University.

Debate over Future Generations Fund
In November 2008, Al-Saraawi submitted a request for an expanded debate on the impact of the global financial crisis on Kuwaiti investments abroad, specifically the Future Generations Fund and the State Reserves Fund.  The two funds are managed by Kuwait Investment Authority (KIA), the country's sovereign wealth fund, mostly in the United States and Europe. Its assets were estimated at close to $300 billion before the outbreak of the global crisis. Saraawi said that it is no secret that there is a direct impact from the global financial meltdown on Kuwaiti investments. He added that MPs also want to know the extent of this impact on the country's financial surpluses in the past few years. A number of top officials, including the finance minister and the governor of the Central Bank, have explicitly said that Kuwaiti foreign holdings have been impacted by the crisis but stressed that the effect has so far been "small."

References

1962 births
Living people
Members of the National Assembly (Kuwait)